Tumi O Tumi is a 2020 Bengali drama film directed by Arunima Dey. This film was released on 17 January 2020.

Plot
The film revolves around the conflict between different stages of a woman's life in a male dominated society. The story is told from the perspective of a writer who narrates her own story. It states the life of three struggling women Gunjan, Sindur and Ashalata who are from three different generations and portrays the real meaning of women empowerment in Indian society.

Cast
 Soumitra Chatterjee
 Lily Chakravarty
 Anuradha Roy
 Rajesh Sharma
 Pulokita Ghosh
 Rajat Ganguly
 Arpita Roy Chowdhury
 Arunima Dey
 Raju Thakar

References

External links

Bengali-language Indian films
2020s Bengali-language films
2020 films
Indian drama films
2020 drama films